Gelvard, also rendered as Gilavard, may refer to:
 Gelvard-e Bozorg
 Gelvard-e Kuchek